The 2016 Scottish Women's Premier League Cup was the 15th edition of the SWPL Cup competition, which began in 2002. The competition was to be contested by all 16 teams of the two divisions of the Scottish Women's Premier League (SWPL 1 and SWPL 2).

First round

Quarter-finals

Semi-finals 

The draw for the semi finals took place on April 6, 2016, at Hampden Park

Final
The final was played on Sunday, 15 June 2016 at the Ainslie Park, Edinburgh
Hibernian won the final 2–1 against Celtic, It was their forth Scottish Woman's Premier League Cup win.

External links
at soccerway.com

References

1
2016–17 domestic women's association football leagues
Scottish Women's Premier League seasons